Alfred Burton Carter (20 October 1877 – 1960) was an English footballer who played in the Football League for Notts County.

References

1877 births
1960 deaths
English footballers
Association football forwards
English Football League players
Notts County F.C. players
Kettering Town F.C. players